Formerly known as Pusat Teknologi dan Pengurusan Lanjutan (PTPL), MSU College (MSUC) is a private college in Malaysia. Its main campus is located in Shah Alam, Selangor.

MSU College (MSUC) main campus:

 Shah Alam, Selangor

MSU College Branches in Malaysia are located in:

Ampang, Kuala Lumpur
Penang
Sungai Petani, Kedah
Seremban, Negeri Sembilan
Kota Bharu, Kelantan
Kuala Terengganu, Terengganu
Kota Kinabalu, Sabah
Kuching, Sarawak

See also
Management and Science University (MSU)

References

External links
MSU College Official website (MSUC) 
Management and Science University (MSU) 

Colleges in Malaysia
Universities and colleges in Selangor
Law schools in Malaysia
1981 establishments in Malaysia
Educational institutions established in 1981
Cambridge schools in Malaysia
Private universities and colleges in Malaysia